Óscar Constantino González Rengifo, known as Óscar González (born 25 January 1992) is a Venezuelan football player. He plays for Monagas.

International career
He was first called up to the Venezuela national football team in February 2015 for friendlies against Honduras, but did not play.

He made his debut on 2 September 2021 in a World Cup qualifier against Argentina, a 1–3 home loss. He started the game and played the whole match.

References

External links
 
 

1992 births
People from Guárico
Living people
Venezuelan footballers
Venezuela international footballers
Association football defenders
Atlético El Vigía players
Trujillanos FC players
Deportivo La Guaira players
Monagas S.C. players
C.S.D. Independiente del Valle footballers
Venezuelan Primera División players
Ecuadorian Serie A players
Venezuelan expatriate footballers
Expatriate footballers in Ecuador